The 1987 Family Circle Cup was a women's tennis tournament played on outdoor clay courts at the Sea Pines Plantation on Hilton Head Island, South Carolina in the United States and was part of the Category 4 tier of the 1987 WTA Tour. It was the 15th edition of the tournament and ran from April 6 through April 12, 1987. First-seeded Steffi Graf won her second consecutive singles title at the event and earned $60,000 first-prize money.

Finals

Singles
 Steffi Graf defeated  Manuela Maleeva 6–2, 4–6, 6–3
 It was Graf's 3rd singles title of the year and the 11th of her career.

Doubles
 Mercedes Paz /  Eva Pfaff defeated  Zina Garrison /  Lori McNeil 7–6(8–6), 7–5
 It was Paz' 1st doubles title of the year and the 6th of her career. It was Pfaff's 1st doubles title of the year and the 5th of her career.

References

External links
 Official website
 ITF tournament edition details
 Tournament draws

Family Circle Cup
Charleston Open
Family Circle Cup
Family Circle Cup
Family Circle Cup